Lonely Is the Name is a 1968 studio album by Sammy Davis Jr.

Reception

The Allmusic review by Lindsay Planer awarded the album three and a half stars and said that Davis "once again blended his interminable hipness with a batch of popular standards and fresh interpretations of selections that he had previously delivered in a distinctly different style"

Track listing
 "Lonely Is the Name" (Bert Kaempfert, Herbert Rehbein, Carl Sigman) - 3:15
 "Up, Up and Away" (Jimmy Webb) - 3:28
 "The Good Life" (Sacha Distel, Jack Reardon) - 2:43
 "Shake, Shake, Shake" (Clark, Resnick) - 3:02
 "We'll Be Together Again" (Carl Fischer, Frankie Laine) - 2:50
 "Don't Take Your Time" (Roger Nichols, Tony Asher) - 2:38
 "Children, Children" (Ken Kaganovitch, Ron Rose) - 3:26
 Medley: "Uptight (Everything's Alright)"/"You've Got Your Troubles" (Stevie Wonder, Sylvia Moy, Henry Cosby)/(Roger Greenaway, Roger Cook) - 3:04
 "All That Jazz (From A Man Called Adam)" (Benny Carter, Al Stillman) - 2:16
 "Ev'ry Time We Say Goodbye" (Cole Porter) - 2:34

Personnel
Sammy Davis Jr. - vocals

References

Reprise Records albums
Albums produced by Jimmy Bowen
Sammy Davis Jr. albums
1968 albums